HMS Discovery was the consort ship of James Cook's third expedition to the Pacific Ocean in 1776–1780.  Like Cook's other ships, Discovery was a Whitby-built collier originally named Diligence when she was built in 1774. Purchased in 1775, the vessel was measured at 299 tons burthen.   Originally a brig, Cook had her changed to a full-rigged ship.  She was commanded by Charles Clerke, who had previously served on Cook's first two expeditions, and had a complement of 70.  After Cook was killed in a skirmish following his attempted kidnapping of Hawaiian leader Kalaniʻōpuʻu, Clerke transferred to the expedition's flagship HMS Resolution and John Gore assumed command of Discovery.  She returned to Britain under the command of Lieutenant James King, arriving back on 4 October 1780.

After returning to the Nore in 1780, Discovery was fitted out as a transport at Woolwich Dockyard, serving as such between December 1780 and May 1781. She then became a dockyard craft at Woolwich, and was broken up at Chatham Dockyard in October 1797.

The ship is the main namesake for the United States National Aeronautics and Space Administration Space Shuttle Orbiter Discovery.

See also
 European and American voyages of scientific exploration
 Age of Discovery

References

 
 Rif Winfield, British Warships in the Age of Sail, 1714-1792 (Seaforth Publishing, 2007).
 Beaglehole, J.C.:  The Life of Captain James Cook.  .

External links
 
 Ships of the World entry
 Digitised copies of the original logs of HMS Discovery, British Atmospheric Data Centre/The National Archives as part of the CORRAL project

 

1774 ships
Ships built in Whitby
James Cook
Exploration ships of the United Kingdom
Sloops of the Royal Navy
Age of Discovery ships